SM Investments Corporation (SMIC), also known as SM Group, is a Filipino conglomerate with interests in shopping mall development and management, retail, real estate development, banking, and tourism. Founded by Henry Sy, it has become one of the largest conglomerates in the Philippines, being the country's dominant player in retail with 208 stores nationwide. Of these, 47 are SM Department Stores; 38 are SM Supermarkets; 37 are SM Hypermarkets, and 86 are SaveMore branches.

It is the largest company in the Philippines in terms of market capitalization, and has repeatedly ranked as the top Philippine company in the Forbes Global 2000.

History
In 1958, Henry Sy Sr. started his first company, ShoeMart (SM), a small shoe store in Carriedo, Manila,Phillipines. He initially focused on buying large supplies of shoes from the United States. His business expanded as he transformed his shoe store into a department store.

In 1978, he began buying supermarkets at the northern end of EDSA in Quezon City. During the 90s when he opened SM Megamall, his companies were listed in the Philippine Stock Exchange, SM Prime Holdings Inc. By 2005, the SM Investments Corporation was inaugurated.

In April 2017, SMIC appointed Jose Sio as CEO.

Subsidiaries
Retail

 SM Markets - a chain of food retail stores consisting of SM Supermarket, SM Hypermarket and Savemore.
 SM Store - a department store
 Walter Mart - a shopping mall owned by a joint venture between SM and a local company.
 Alfamart - a convenience store owned by a joint venture between SM and an Indonesian company.
 Specialty Stores - SM operates leading local retail chains such as Ace Hardware, SM Appliances, Homeworld, Our Home, Toy Kingdom (International Toyworld Inc.), Kultura, Baby Company, Sports Central, Pet Express, Miniso, Watsons, Uniqlo, etc.
Gentree Fund - a venture capital fund investing in early-stage all the way to pre-IPO companies.

Banking
 BDO Unibank - one of the largest banks in the Philippines
 ChinaBank - the first privately owned local commercial bank in the Philippines - (SM owns 30% of the company)

Property

 SM Supermalls - the shopping malls of SM Investments Corporation is operated by its subsidiary, SM Prime Holdings. 
 SM Development Corporation (SMDC) - is a residential property developer which focuses on the premium middle market. SMDC now operates SM Residences and MPlace.
Mall of Asia Complex - is an alternative business and tourism district, as well as the home of the SM Mall of Asia, SMX Convention Center (the largest private venue in the Philippines), OneE-com Center and Mall of Asia Arena (one of the largest private sports venues in the Philippines). The Mall of Asia Complex occupies 60 hectares of land along the coast of Manila Bay, offering locations for business, tourism, retail, and leisure projects.
 OCLP Holdings - the parent of Ortigas & Company Limited Partnership. Since November 2014, the consortium of SM Investments and the family of Francisco Ortigas has owned 37% of the holding.

Lifestyle Entertainment
 SM Cinema - includes Director's Club Cinema, IMAX Theatre, WM Cinemas, Blink, ePlus and Snack Time.
 SM Skating
 SM Bowling and Leisure Center
 Exploreum
 SM Tickets
 SM Mall of Asia Arena is a venue which hosts concerts and other big events, opened on June 16, 2012. Its seating capacity is 16,000 and it hosted the 2013 FIBA Asia Championship. It is one of the largest arenas in the Philippines. In 2013, the SM Group announced that there will be another arena named Seaside City Arena in SM Seaside City Cebu in Cebu City. However, in January 2017, SM decided to cancel its plans to build the arena due to the alleged attacks by the Cebu City mayor, Tomas Osmeña against the project.
 SM Food Court
 SM Appliances Center

Leisure
 Costa del Hamilo Inc - is a large-scale eco-tourism project to develop in phases 5,700 hectares of land by the sea in Nasugbu, Batangas into a network of coastal resort communities.
 Highlands Prime, Inc. - is a residential developer in Tagaytay Highlands, a mountainside resort and residential complex.

Mining
Atlas Consolidated Mining and Development Corporation - is engaged in gold mining operations.

Hotels and Convention Centers
 SM Hotels
Conrad Manila in Pasay
Taal Vista Hotel in Tagaytay City
Pico Sands Hotel in Nasugbu
Pico de Loro 
Radisson Blu Hotel in Cebu
Park Inn by Radisson in Davao
Park Inn by Radisson in Clark
Park Inn by Radisson in North Edsa
Park Inn by Radisson in Iloilo
SMX Convention Center (SMX) is a convention center used for hosting conventions, seminars, and conferences.
Mall of Asia complex in Pasay, opened on November 26, 2007
SM Lanang Premier in Davao City, opened on September 12, 2012
SM Aura Premier in Taguig City, opened on May 17, 2013
SM City Bacolod, opened in September 2014
SM Seaside City Cebu opened on 2015
SM City Clark
Megatrade Hall in Mandaluyong 
Cebu Trade Hall in Cebu City

Education
National University at Manila - a private non–sectarian coeducational institution in Manila.
Asia Pacific College - a joint venture between SM and IBM Philippines.

Gaming
Belle Corporation is Henry Sy's foray in the gaming industry in the Philippines, hoping to capitalize the future of Pagcor's entertainment city. - (SM owns 27%)

Other Investments
 2GO - supply chain operating in shipping, freight, warehousing and express delivery. - (SM owns 52.9%)
 ABS-CBN Corporation - broadcasting company and media concessionaire owned by Lopez Holdings Corporation. - (SM owns 57.9%)
 CityMall - commercial centers owned by a joint venture between SM and DoubleDragon Properties Corp.
 Goldilocks - a leading Filipino bakeshop heritage brand trusted by Filipino consumers for over 50 years. -  (SM owns 74%)
 MyTown - Dormitories owned by Philippines Urban Living Solutions, Inc.
 Philippine Geothermal Production Company (PGPC) - geothermal development company owned by Allfirst Equity Holdings (AEH)  -  (SM owns 100%)
 United Infrastructure Corporation - infrastructure development owned by a joint venture between ABS-CBN Corporation and SM Investments.

Social involvement
SM Foundation is the corporate responsibility arm of the SM Group of Companies. The foundation has various areas of advocacy: education, scholarship programs, building schoolhouses, a mall-based outreach program, health care, medical missions, mobile clinics, hospital activity centers and religious community projects.

SM Cares
SM Cares is a program created to consolidate and coordinate all of SM Prime's corporate social responsibility (CSR) initiatives. Carried out in all 40 SM malls nationwide, SM Cares' CSR projects cover environmental conservation (energy, air and water), and assistance to customers of SM malls with special needs such as the disabled, special children, the elderly and nursing mothers.

References

External links
 
 SM Prime Holdings website

 
Companies based in Pasay
Companies listed on the Philippine Stock Exchange
Holding companies of the Philippines
Multinational companies headquartered in the Philippines
Holding companies established in 1994
Philippine companies established in 1994
Conglomerate companies of the Philippines